Pakokku Bridge is a rail and road bridge across the Irrawaddy River in Myanmar's Pakokku town. The bridge is part of the India–Myanmar–Thailand Trilateral Highway and is the longest bridge in Myanmar.

Construction
The bridge connects the town of Pakokku with the administrative district of Nyaung-U. The bridge has a 28 foot wide motorway and a 14 foot wide roadway in parallel besides two pedestrian walkways measuring three foot and three inches. It is a broad crested type bridge with a 52 foot high and 262 feet wide clearance area. The bridge also has a 512 feet long approach bridge and an 850 feet long approach embankment. The bridge was inaugurated on 1 January 2012 by Vice-president Tin Aung Myint Oo.

Gallery

See also 
 
 
 List of bridges in Myanmar

References 

Bridges in Myanmar
Buildings and structures in Mandalay Region
Bridges completed in 2011
2011 establishments in Myanmar